Rattle may refer to:

Instruments 
 Crotalus (liturgy), a liturgical percussion instrument 
 Rattle (percussion instrument), a type of percussion instrument
 Rattle (percussion beater), a part of some percussion instruments
 Ratchet (instrument), a percussion instrument
 Bird-scaring rattle, a Slovene device used to drive birds off vineyards and a folk instrument
 Toy rattle, a baby toy

Music 
 The Rattles, German rock band who recorded an upbeat version of "Zip-a-dee-doo-dah" in the 1960s also famous for their 1970 hit "The Witch"
 "Rattle" (song), a 2011 electro house song by Dutch duo Bingo Players
 "Rattle!", a 2020 song by American contemporary worship band Elevation Worship
 Rattle Records, a New Zealand contemporary art-music label.

Places 
 Rattle, Derbyshire, a hamlet in England
 Rattle Hill, a summit in Sullivan County, New York

People 
 Frederick Rattle (1869–1950), Australian politician
 Nick Levay aka Rattle (1977–2021), American computer security expert 
 Simon Rattle (born 1955), English conductor

Science 
 Death rattle, gurgling sounds often produced by a person near death
 Rhinanthus, a genus of plants
 RATTLE, a constraint algorithm used in molecular dynamics simulations
 Rattle GUI a gui for the statistical programming language R

Other 
 Rattle (magazine), an American poetry journal

See also 
 Rattlesnake
 Rattle and Hum, a 1988 album by Irish rock band U2